Ralph Grayham Gubbins (31 January 1932 – 11 September 2011) was an English professional footballer who played as an inside forward. Gubbins made nearly 250 appearances in the Football League for three clubs between 1952 and 1964, before playing non-league football.

Career
Born in Ellesmere Port, Gubbins played in the Football League for  Bolton Wanderers, Hull City and Tranmere Rovers, before playing non-league football with Wigan Athletic.

While at Bolton, Gubbins replaced the injured Nat Lofthouse for the 1958 FA Cup Semi final, scoring both goals that sent Bolton to the final. Lofthouse returned for the final, which Bolton won. He spent one season in the Cheshire League with Wigan, scoring 7 goals in 30 league games.

He died on 11 September 2011.

References

1932 births
2011 deaths
Bolton Wanderers F.C. players
Hull City A.F.C. players
Tranmere Rovers F.C. players
People from Ellesmere Port
English Football League players
Wigan Athletic F.C. players
Association football inside forwards
English footballers